is a 2016 Japanese supernatural horror film directed by Kōji Shiraishi. It is a crossover of the Ju-on and the Ring series. The film was first teased as an April Fools' joke on April 1, 2015, but was later confirmed on December 10 to be a real production. It was released in Japan on June 18, 2016, Indonesia in August 10 (followed by 4DX in February 15, 2017), and in North America on the streaming site Shudder on January 26, 2017. It received mixed reviews from critics.

Plot 

A social worker visits the residence of an elderly woman, only to find her strangled by an electric cord. A nearby video player suddenly turns on and plays the cursed videotape. As she watches, Sadako Yamamura appears and kills the social worker.

The video player is sold at a shop and bought by university students Yuri Kurahashi and Natsumi Ueno. When they find the cursed videotape inside, they play it. The footage has been upgraded, displaying a decrepit building instead of the usual well, and the curse deadline being reduced to two days. Yuri gets distracted, leaving Natsumi to watch by herself. Afterward, they receive a disturbing phone call as Sadako manifests, startling Natsumi.

A worker at the shop who had watched the cursed tape leaps to her death. The girls go to return the video player and learn about the deaths related to the tape. Desperate, they go to their professor, an author on urban legends, Shin'ichi Morishige. Obsessed with the idea of meeting Sadako, Morishige eagerly watches the tape. After he receives a phone call, Morishige takes the girls to an exorcist but Sadako possesses Natsumi and forces the assistants to kill themselves before the exorcist kills Morishige. With her dying breath, the exorcist tells the girls that a man with psychic powers, Keizo Tokiwa, will help them.

When Natsumi blames Yuri for her situation, Yuri watches the tape, hoping that this will pass the curse on to her and Natsumi will be spared. Keizo arrives, accompanied by a blind psychic girl, Tamao, who tells Yuri that she has unnecessarily cursed herself. The only way to expunge the curse is to pit Sadako against another vengeful spirit so both destroy each other. Natsumi uploads the tape to the Internet and tries to commit suicide to escape her imminent death. However, Sadako kills Natsumi before she can. Keizo and Tamao target Kayako Saeki to be the rival spirit.

Meanwhile, high school student Suzuka Takagi starts having dreams of the haunted Saeki house after moving in nearby with her family. She runs into Keizo and Tamao, who states that the house beckons to Suzuka, he warns her not to enter or she will be killed. That night, Suzuka thinks she sees a schoolboy inside the Saeki house and goes inside. She sees Toshio and her screams prompt her parents to rush in, causing them to be killed by Toshio and Kayako. Keizo saves Suzuka but she is already cursed. Yuri and Suzuka team up for Keizo's plan, where they will enter the Saeki house so that Suzuka can watch the cursed tape inside and Yuri can see Kayako, thus becoming afflicted with both curses. Keizo hopes this will make Sadako and Kayako fight over the girls and destroy each other in the process.

As the plan unfolds, Toshio appears but Sadako drags him inside the TV as he screams. Sadako crawls out of the TV whilst Kayako crawls downstairs, starts brutally confront each other but the battle ends in a stalemate. Keizo reveals his last resort: one of the girls has to lure both ghosts into a well outside of the house so they can be sealed inside. Yuri chooses to sacrifice herself, jumping into the well as Sadako and Kayako begin to rush toward her, resulting in a massive collision that bisects Keizo and turns both ghosts into a giant mass of hair, flesh and eyes. The giant mass falls into the well, presumably crushing Yuri to death. Suzuka seals the well and imprisons the ghosts.

This last resort does not work either, and instead backfires terribly: both Sadako and Kayako's curses combine and become a single entity: Sadakaya. Now possessing Yuri's body with the appearance of Sadako, a combined movement of both spirits and the sound of Kayako's death rattle. Suzuka screams in horror and Tamao's psychic powers are overwhelmed. Toshio reappears behind them, and the girls' fates are left unknown.

In a post-credits scene, the modified version of the cursed videotape is shown. Sadakaya menacingly contorts her body, imitating the movements of both Sadako and Kayako. She then teleports to the screen, emitting a death rattle.

Cast 
 Mizuki Yamamoto as Yūri Kurahashi/Sadakaya
 Tina Tamashiro as Suzuka Takagi
 Aimi Satsukawa as Natsumi Ueno
 Masahiro Komoto as Shin'ichi Morishige
 Masanobu Andō as Keizō Tokiwa
 Mai Kikuchi as Tamao
 Misato Tanaka as Fumiko Takagi
 Masayoshi Matsushima as Sukemune Takagi
 Ichiruko Domen as Hōryū
 Runa Endo as Kayako Saeki
 Elly Nanami as Sadako Yamamura
 Rintaro Shibamoto as Toshio Saeki

Production 
Despite a rumor about Takako Fuji reprising her role as Kayako in this crossover, the actress stated several times on Twitter that she was not playing this representation of the character. Masaki Saisho, who played Kayako in Ju-On: The Beginning of the End and Ju-On: The Final Curse, does not appear in the film either. This makes Runa Endo the fifth actress to play Kayako (counting Aiko Horiuchi, who starred in The Grudge 3 and Anna Moon in Tales from the Grudge).

As for Sadako, Elly Nanami is the seventh actress to play the role, after Rie Inō (Ring, Ring 2), Hinako Saeki (Rasen), Ayane Miura (Ring: Kanzenban), Tae Kimura (Ring: The Final Chapter, Rasen), Yukie Nakama (Ring 0: Birthday) and Ai Hashimoto (Sadako 3D) (excluding Samara Morgan's and Park Eun-Suh's incarnations from The Ring and The Ring Virus respectively).

It was released as part of a double A-side single on June 15, 2016, which also included an English-language version of the song.

Promotion and marketing 
Several events were held for the promotion of the movie. On Twitter, users could vote for either Sadako or Kayako as their favorite horror icon up until the day of the film's release. Two videos, one for Sadako and one for Kayako and Toshio, were uploaded to YouTube to appeal to voters. Sadako won. At the end of May, a press conference was held to promote the movie. As with the previous Ju-on movies, Sadako, Kayako and Toshio were present, in costume, and stayed true to their roles. In the beginning of June, a baseball match featuring the Nippon-Ham Fighters and the Yakult Swallows was interrupted by Sadako, Kayako and Toshio who staged the first pit ceremony. Other videos were released at the same time, featuring the ghosts of the movie teaching theater etiquette, such as not bringing recording devices or avoiding to take minors to see the movie. Social media was also heavily used to promote the movie. A Twitter account created for Sadako (as a promotion for the Sadako 3D movie) was reused. An Instagram account was created for Kayako and Toshio, depicting humorous, everyday life situation with the two ghosts. Promotional items playing on the Kawaii culture regularly seen in Japan were released. These items included cup hangers, beauty masks and even a collaboration with the Hello Kitty brand. Other items were more traditional, such as T-shirts, key rings and doorknob hangers.

On December 2–4, and December 9–25, 2016, they began to promote Kayako and Sadako into the virtual reality at Laforet Harajuku, as they held a virtual experience to celebrate the film's home video release. Shudder later released with the English subtitles on January 26, 2017.

Reception
The film has received mixed reviews.  John Squires of Bloody Disgusting complained that the title was deceptive: "It's not merely that it takes too long to get to the good stuff, it's that the good stuff never comes at all". He further stated the film was just not interesting: "Feeling like a reboot of The Ring crudely smashed together with a reboot of The Grudge, the film hardly brings the two franchises together in any sort of creative fashion, and it's all very clunky; worse yet, it's incredibly boring". Joe Lipsett, also writing for Bloody Disgusting, agreed saying that "the biggest flaw of Sadako vs. Kayako is that it takes far, far too long to get the titular to face off.....Even the narrative hoops required to bring the two franchises together doesn't hold up under scrutiny!"

More positive reviews include Chris Alexander, writing for Comingsoon.net, who found the film to be "goofy but entertaining". Katie Rife for The A.V. Club admitted that the "vs" in the title came up short, but said: "Still, for fans of Japanese horror looking for popcorn entertainment, or for fans of Western horror looking for something different-yet-familiar, it's worth indulging your curiosity for 98 minutes".

See also 

 Freddy vs. Jason
 Alien vs. Predator
 The Ring (franchise)
 Ju-On (franchise)
 List of ghost films

References

External links 
  
 
 

2016 films
2016 horror films
Films about curses
Films directed by Kōji Shiraishi
Films set in the 2000s
Horror crossover films
Japanese haunted house films
Japanese supernatural horror films
Ju-On films
The Ring (franchise)
2010s Japanese films
2010s Japanese-language films